Branco & Gilli, Danish rapping duo made up of

Branco (rapper) of the duo MellemFingaMuzik
Gilli (rapper)